Human Fragility is an oil on canvas painting of 1656 by the Italian artist Salvator Rosa. It was painted during a time of great pestilence; many of Rosa's relatives, including his son, brother, and sister, died. The seated woman is said to be Lucrezia, Rosa's mistress, and the young boy his son, wrist clenched by Death. The angel of death is manipulating the boy's hand to write "Conceptio Culpa, Nasci Pena, Labor Vita, Necesse Mori – 'Conception is a sin, Birth is pain, Life is toil, Death a necessity." The canvas is adorned with many foreboding indicia and memento mori(s).

References

1656 paintings
Paintings by Salvator Rosa
Collections of the Fitzwilliam Museum